The Sino-Indian border dispute is an ongoing territorial dispute over the sovereignty of two relatively large, and several smaller, separated pieces of territory between China and India. The first of the territories, Aksai Chin, is administered by China as part of the Xinjiang Uygur Autonomous Region and Tibet Autonomous Region and claimed by India as part of the union territory of Ladakh; it is mostly uninhabited high-altitude wasteland in the larger regions of Kashmir and Tibet and is crossed by the Xinjiang-Tibet Highway, but with some significant pasture lands at the margins. The other disputed territory is south of the McMahon Line, in the area formerly known as the North-East Frontier Agency and now called Arunachal Pradesh which is administered by India. The McMahon Line was part of the 1914 Simla Convention signed between British India and Tibet, without China's agreement. China disowns the agreement, stating that Tibet was never independent when it signed the Simla Convention.

The 1962 Sino-Indian War was fought in both disputed areas. Chinese troops attacked Indian border posts in Ladakh in the west and crossed the McMahon line in the east. There was a brief border clash in 1967 in the region of Sikkim. In 1987 and in 2013, potential conflicts over the two differing Lines of Actual Control were successfully de-escalated. A conflict involving a Bhutanese-controlled area on the border between Bhutan and China was successfully de-escalated in 2017 following injuries to both Indian and Chinese troops. Multiple brawls broke out in 2020, escalating to dozens of deaths in June 2020.

Agreements signed pending the ultimate resolution of the boundary question were concluded in 1993 and 1996. This included "confidence-building measures" and the Line of Actual Control. To address the boundary question formalised groups were created such as the Joint Working Group (JWG) on the boundary question. It would be assisted by the Diplomatic and Military Expert Group. In 2003 the Special Representatives (SRs) mechanism was constituted. In 2012 another dispute resolution mechanism, the Working Mechanism for Consultation and Coordination (WMCC) was framed.

Background

Aksai Chin

The desolation of this area meant that it had no significant human importance other than ancient trade routes crossing it, providing brief passage during summer for caravans of yaks from Xinjiang and Tibet.

One of the earliest treaties regarding the boundaries in the western sector was issued in 1842 following the Dogra–Tibetan War. The Sikh Empire of the Punjab region had annexed Ladakh into the state of Jammu in 1834. In 1841, they invaded Tibet with an army. Chinese forces defeated the Sikh army and in turn entered Ladakh and besieged Leh. After being checked by the Sikh forces, the Chinese and the Sikhs signed a treaty in September 1842, which stipulated no transgressions or interference in the other country's frontiers. The British defeat of the Sikhs in 1846 resulted in transfer of sovereignty over Ladakh to the British, and British commissioners attempted to meet with Chinese officials to discuss the border they now shared. However, both sides were sufficiently satisfied that a traditional border was recognised and defined by natural elements, and the border was not demarcated. The boundaries at the two extremities, Pangong Lake and Karakoram Pass, were reasonably well-defined, but the Aksai Chin area in between lay largely undefined.

The Johnson Line 

W. H. Johnson, a civil servant with the Survey of India proposed the "Johnson Line" in 1865, which put Aksai Chin in Jammu and Kashmir. This was the time of the Dungan revolt, when China did not control Xinjiang, so this line was never presented to the Chinese. Johnson presented this line to the Maharaja of Jammu and Kashmir, who then claimed the 18,000 square kilometres contained within his territory and by some accounts he claimed territory further north as far as the Sanju Pass in the Kun Lun Mountains. The Maharajah of Jammu and Kashmir constructed a fort at Shahidulla (modern-day Xaidulla), and had troops stationed there for some years to protect caravans. Eventually, most sources placed Shahidulla and the upper Karakash River firmly within the territory of Xinjiang (see accompanying map). According to Francis Younghusband, who explored the region in the late 1880s, there was only an abandoned fort and not one inhabited house at Shahidulla when he was there – it was just a convenient staging post and a convenient headquarters for the nomadic Kirghiz. The abandoned fort had apparently been built a few years earlier by the Dogras.  In 1878 the Chinese had reconquered Xinjiang, and by 1890 they already had Shahidulla before the issue was decided. By 1892, China had erected boundary markers at Karakoram Pass.

In 1897 a British military officer, Sir John Ardagh, proposed a boundary line along the crest of the Kun Lun Mountains north of the Yarkand River. At the time Britain was concerned at the danger of Russian expansion as China weakened, and Ardagh argued that his line was more defensible. The Ardagh line was effectively a modification of the Johnson line, and became known as the "Johnson-Ardagh Line".

The Macartney-Macdonald Line 

In 1893, Hung Ta-chen, a senior Chinese official at St. Petersburg, gave maps of the region to George Macartney, the British consul general at Kashgar, which coincided in broad details. In 1899, Britain proposed a revised boundary, initially suggested by Macartney and developed by the Governor General of India Lord Elgin. This boundary placed the Lingzi Tang plains, which are south of the Laktsang range, in India, and Aksai Chin proper, which is north of the Laktsang range, in China. This border, along the Karakoram Mountains, was proposed and supported by British officials for a number of reasons. The Karakoram Mountains formed a natural boundary, which would set the British borders up to the Indus River watershed while leaving the Tarim River watershed in Chinese control, and Chinese control of this tract would present a further obstacle to Russian advance in Central Asia. The British presented this line, known as the Macartney-MacDonald Line, to the Chinese in 1899 in a note by Sir Claude MacDonald. The Qing government did not respond to the note. According to some commentators, China believed that this had been the accepted boundary.

1899 to 1945 
Both the Johnson-Ardagh and the Macartney-MacDonald lines were used on British maps of India. Until at least 1908, the British took the Macdonald line to be the boundary, but in 1911, the Xinhai Revolution resulted in the collapse of central power in China, and by the end of World War I, the British officially used the Johnson Line. However they took no steps to establish outposts or assert actual control on the ground. In 1927, the line was adjusted again as the government of British India abandoned the Johnson line in favour of a line along the Karakoram range further south. However, the maps were not updated and still showed the Johnson Line.

From 1917 to 1933, the "Postal Atlas of China", published by the Government of China in Peking had shown the boundary in Aksai Chin as per the Johnson line, which runs along the Kunlun mountains. The "Peking University Atlas", published in 1925, also put the Aksai Chin in India. When British officials learned of Soviet officials surveying the Aksai Chin for Sheng Shicai, warlord of Xinjiang in 1940–1941, they again advocated the Johnson Line. At this point the British had still made no attempts to establish outposts or control over the Aksai Chin, nor was the issue ever discussed with the governments of China or Tibet, and the boundary remained undemarcated at India's independence.

Since 1947 
Upon independence in 1947, the government of India fixed its official boundary in the west, which included the Aksai Chin, in a manner that resembled the Ardagh–Johnson Line. India's basis for defining the border was "chiefly by long usage and custom". Unlike the Johnson line, India did not claim the northern areas near Shahidulla and Khotan. From the Karakoram Pass (which is not under dispute), the Indian claim line extends northeast of the Karakoram Mountains north of the salt flats of the Aksai Chin, to set a boundary at the Kunlun Mountains, and incorporating part of the Karakash River and Yarkand River watersheds. From there, it runs east along the Kunlun Mountains, before turning southwest through the Aksai Chin salt flats, through the Karakoram Mountains, and then to Pangong Lake.

On 1 July 1954 Prime Minister Nehru wrote a memo directing that the maps of India be revised to show definite boundaries on all frontiers. Up to this point, the boundary in the Aksai Chin sector, based on the Johnson Line, had been described as "undemarcated."

Trans Karakoram Tract 

The Johnson Line is not used west of the Karakoram Pass, where China adjoins Pakistan-administered Gilgit–Baltistan. On 13 October 1962, China and Pakistan began negotiations over the boundary west of the Karakoram Pass. India does not recognise that Pakistan and China have a common border, and claims the tract as part of the domains of the pre-1947 state of Kashmir and Jammu. However, India's claim line in that area does not extend as far north of the Karakoram Mountains as the Johnson Line. China and India still have disputes on these borders.

The McMahon Line

British India annexed Assam in northeastern India in 1826, by Treaty of Yandabo at the conclusion of the First Anglo-Burmese War (1824–1826). After subsequent Anglo-Burmese Wars, the whole of Burma was annexed giving the British a border with China's Yunan province.

In 1913–14, representatives of Britain, China, and Tibet attended a conference in Simla, India and drew up an agreement concerning Tibet's status and borders. The McMahon Line, a proposed boundary between Tibet and India for the eastern sector, was drawn by British negotiator Henry McMahon on a map attached to the agreement. All three representatives initialled the agreement, but Beijing soon objected to the proposed Sino-Tibet boundary and repudiated the agreement, refusing to sign the final, more detailed map. After approving a note which stated that China could not enjoy rights under the agreement unless she ratified it, the British and Tibetan negotiators signed the Simla Convention and more detailed map as a bilateral accord. Neville Maxwell states that McMahon had been instructed not to sign bilaterally with Tibetans if China refused, but he did so without the Chinese representative present and then kept the declaration secret.

V. K. Singh argues that the basis of these boundaries, accepted by British India and Tibet, were that the historical boundaries of India were the Himalayas and the areas south of the Himalayas were traditionally Indian and associated with India. The high watershed of the Himalayas was proposed as the border between India and its northern neighbours. India's government held the view that the Himalayas were the ancient boundaries of the Indian subcontinent and thus should be the modern boundaries of British India and later the Republic of India.

Chinese boundary markers, including one set up by the newly created Chinese Republic, stood near Walong until January 1914, when T. O'Callaghan, an assistant administrator of North East Frontier Agency (NEFA)'s eastern sector, relocated them north to locations closer to the McMahon Line (albeit still South of the Line). He then went to Rima, met with Tibetan officials, and saw no Chinese influence in the area.

By signing the Simla Agreement with Tibet, the British had violated the Anglo-Russian Convention of 1907, in which both parties were not to negotiate with Tibet, "except through the intermediary of the Chinese Government", as well as the Anglo-Chinese Convention of 1906, which bound the British government "not to annex Tibetan territory." Because of doubts concerning the legal status of the accord, the British did not put the McMahon Line on their maps until 1937, nor did they publish the Simla Convention in the treaty record until 1938. Rejecting Tibet's 1913 declaration of independence, China argued that the Simla Convention and McMahon Line were illegal and that Tibetan government was merely a local government without treaty-making powers.

The British records show that the Tibetan government's acceptance of the new border in 1914 was conditional on China accepting the Simla Convention. Since the British were not able to get an acceptance from China, Tibetans considered the McMahon line invalid. Tibetan officials continued to administer Tawang and refused to concede territory during negotiations in 1938. The governor of Assam asserted that Tawang was "undoubtedly British" but noted that it was "controlled by Tibet, and none of its inhabitants have any idea that they are not Tibetan." During World War II, with India's east threatened by Japanese troops and with the threat of Chinese expansionism, British troops secured Tawang for extra defence.

China's claim on areas south of the McMahon Line, encompassed in the NEFA, were based on the traditional boundaries. India believes that the boundaries China proposed in Ladakh and Arunachal Pradesh have no written basis and no documentation of acceptance by anyone apart from China. The Indian government has argued that China claims the territory on the basis that it was under Chinese imperial control in the past, while the Chinese government argues that India claims the territory on the basis that it was under British imperial control in the past. The last Qing emperor's 1912 edict of abdication authorised its succeeding republican government to form a union of "five peoples, namely, Manchus, Han Chinese, Mongols, Muslims, and Tibetans together with their territory in its integrity." However, the practice that India does not place a claim to the regions which previously had the presence of the Mauryan Empire and Chola Dynasty, but which were heavily influenced by Indian culture, further complicates the issue.

India's claim line in the eastern sector follows its interpretation of the McMahon Line. The line drawn by McMahon on the detailed 24–25 March 1914 Simla Treaty maps clearly starts at 27°45’40"N, a trijunction between Bhutan, China, and India, and from there, extends eastwards. Most of the fighting in the eastern sector before the start of the war would take place immediately north of this line. However, India claimed that the intent of the treaty was to follow the main watershed ridge divide of the Himalayas based on memos from McMahon and the fact that over 90% of the McMahon Line does in fact follow the main watershed ridge divide of the Himalayas. They claimed that territory south of the high ridges here near Bhutan (as elsewhere along most of the McMahon Line) should be Indian territory and north of the high ridges should be Chinese territory. In the Indian claim, the two armies would be separated from each other by the highest mountains in the world.

During and after the 1950s, when India began patrolling this area and mapping in greater detail, they confirmed what the 1914 Simla agreement map depicted: six river crossings that interrupted the main Himalayan watershed ridge. At the westernmost location near Bhutan north of Tawang, they modified their maps to extend their claim line northwards to include features such as Thag La ridge, Longju, and Khinzemane as Indian territory. Thus, the Indian version of the McMahon Line moves the Bhutan-China-India trijunction north to 27°51’30"N from 27°45’40"N. India would claim that the treaty map ran along features such as Thag La ridge, though the actual treaty map itself is topographically vague (as the treaty was not accompanied with demarcation) in places, shows a straight line (not a watershed ridge) near Bhutan and near Thag La, and the treaty includes no verbal description of geographic features nor description of the highest ridges.

Sikkim

The Nathu La and Cho La clashes were a series of military clashes in 1967 between India and China alongside the border of the Himalayan Kingdom of Sikkim, then an Indian protectorate. The end of the conflicts saw a Chinese military withdrawal from Sikkim.

In 1975, the Sikkimese monarchy held a referendum, in which the Sikkemese voted overwhelmingly in favour of joining India. At the time China protested and rejected it as illegal. The Sino-Indian Memorandum of 2003 was hailed as a de facto Chinese acceptance of the annexation. China published a map showing Sikkim as a part of India and the Foreign Ministry deleted it from the list of China's "border countries and regions". However, the Sikkim-China border's northernmost point, "The Finger", continues to be the subject of dispute and military activity.

Chinese Prime Minister Wen Jiabao said in 2005 that "Sikkim is no longer the problem between China and India."

Boundary disputes

1947–1962 

During the 1950s, the People's Republic of China built a  road connecting Xinjiang and western Tibet, of which  ran south of the Johnson Line through the Aksai Chin region claimed by India. Aksai Chin was easily accessible from China, but for the Indians on the south side of the Karakoram, the mountain range proved to be a complication in their access to Aksai Chin. The Indians did not learn of the existence of the road until 1957, which was confirmed when the road was shown in Chinese maps published in 1958.

The Indian position, as stated by prime minister Jawaharlal Nehru, was that the Aksai Chin was "part of the Ladakh region of India for centuries" and that this northern border was a "firm and definite one which was not open to discussion with anybody".

The Chinese minister, Zhou Enlai argued that the western border had never been delimited, that the Macartney-MacDonald Line, which left the Aksai Chin within Chinese borders was the only line ever proposed to a Chinese government, and that the Aksai Chin was already under Chinese jurisdiction, and that negotiations should take into account the status quo.

In 1960, based on an agreement between Nehru and Zhou Enlai, officials from India and China held discussions in order to settle the boundary dispute. China and India disagreed on the major watershed that defined the boundary in the western sector. The Chinese statements with respect to their border claims often misrepresented the cited sources.

1967 Nathu La and Cho La clashes 
The Nathu La and Cho La clashes were a series of military clashes in 1967, between India and China alongside the border of the Himalayan Kingdom of Sikkim, then an Indian protectorate.

The Nathu La clashes started on 11 September 1967, when the People's Liberation Army (PLA) launched an attack on Indian posts at Nathu La, and lasted till 15 September 1967. In October 1967, another military duel took place at Cho La and ended on the same day.

According to independent sources, the Indian forces achieved "decisive tactical advantage" and defeated the Chinese forces in these clashes. Many PLA fortifications at Nathu La were said to be destroyed, where the Indian troops drove back the attacking Chinese forces.

1987 Sino Indian skirmish 

The 1987 Sino-Indian skirmish was the third military conflict between the Chinese People's Liberation Army Ground Force and Indian Army that occurred at the Sumdorong Chu Valley, with the previous one taking place 20 years earlier.

1968–2017 

On 20 October 1975, 4 Indian soldiers were killed at Tulung La in Arunachal Pradesh. According to the official statement by the Indian government, a patrol of the Assam Rifles comprising a non-commissioned officer (NCO) and four other soldiers was ambushed by about 40 Chinese soldiers while in an area well within Indian territory, and which had been regularly patrolled for years without incident. Four members of the patrol unit were initially listed as missing before confirmation via diplomatic channels they had been killed by the Chinese troops; their bodies were later returned. The Indian government registered a strong protest with the Chinese.

In 2006, the Chinese ambassador to India claimed that all of Arunachal Pradesh is Chinese territory amidst a military buildup. At the time, both countries claimed incursions as much as a kilometre at the northern tip of Sikkim. In 2009, India announced it would deploy additional military forces along the border. In 2014, India proposed China should acknowledge a "One India" policy to resolve the border dispute.

In April 2013 India claimed, referencing their own perception of the Line of Actual Control (LAC) location, that Chinese troops had established a camp in the Daulat Beg Oldi sector,  on their side of the Line of Actual Control. This figure was later revised to a  claim. According to Indian media, the incursion included Chinese military helicopters entering Indian airspace to drop supplies to the troops. However, Chinese officials denied any trespassing having taken place. Soldiers from both countries briefly set up camps on the ill-defined frontier facing each other, but the tension was defused when both sides pulled back soldiers in early May. In September 2014, India and China had a standoff at the LAC, when Indian workers began constructing a canal in the border village of Demchok, Ladakh, and Chinese civilians protested with the army's support. It ended after about three weeks, when both sides agreed to withdraw troops. The Indian army claimed that the Chinese military had set up a camp  inside territory claimed by India. According to scholar Harsh V. Pant, China gains territory with every incursion.

In September 2015, Chinese and Indian troops faced off in the Burtse region of northern Ladakh after Indian troops dismantled a disputed watchtower the Chinese were building close to the mutually agreed patrolling line.

2017 Doklam military standoff 

In June, a military standoff occurred between India and China in the disputed territory of Doklam, near the Doka La pass. On 16 June 2017, the Chinese brought heavy road building equipment to the Doklam region and began constructing a road in the disputed area. Previously, China had built a dirt road terminating at Doka La where Indian troops were stationed. They would conduct foot patrol from this point up till the Royal Bhutanese Army (RBA) post at Jampheri Ridge. The dispute that ensued post 16 June stemmed from the fact that the Chinese had begun building a road below Doka La, in what India and Bhutan claim to be disputed territory. This resulted in Indian intervention of China's road construction on 18 June, two days after construction began. Bhutan claims that the Chinese have violated the written agreements between the two countries that were drawn up in 1988 and 1998 after extensive rounds of talks. The agreements drawn state that status quo must be maintained in the Doklam area as of before March 1959. It is these agreements that China has violated by constructing a road below Doka La. A series of statements from each countries' respective External Affairs ministries were issued defending each countries' actions. Due to the ambiguity of earlier rounds of border talks beginning from the 1890 Anglo-Chinese Convention that was signed in Kolkata on 17 March 1890, each country refers to different agreements drawn when trying to defend its position on the border dispute. Following the incursion, on 28 June, the Chinese military claimed that India had blocked the construction of a road that was taking place in China's sovereign territory. On 30 June, India's Foreign Ministry claimed that China's road construction in violation of the status quo had security implications for India. Following this, on 5 July, Bhutan issued a demarche asking China to restore the status quo as of before 16 June. Throughout July and August, the Doklam issue remained unresolved. On 28 August, India issued a statement saying that both countries have agreed to "expeditious disengagement" in the Doklam region.

In 2019, India and China decided to coordinate border patrolling at one disputed point along the LAC.

2020–2022 skirmishes 

In June 2020, Indian and Chinese troops engaged in a brawl in the Galwan River valley which reportedly led to the deaths of 20 Indian soldiers. International media claimed 40+ Chinese soldiers had been killed, but this number has not been confirmed by Chinese authorities.

Timeline

Boundary discussions 
One of the first set of formal talks between China and India on the border were following Zhou Enlai's visit to India in 19–25 April 1960.  Following this there were a further three sessions of talks, the "Official's" talks, between— 15 June-6 July 1960; 15 August-24 September 1960; and 7 November-12 December 1960. These discussions produced the 'Report of the Officials on the boundary question'.

Boundary discussions have covered micro and macro issues of the dispute. At a local level, localised disputes and related events such as de-engagement and de-escalation are tackled. Wider overarching issues include discussion related to a package settlement versus sector-wise, clarification of the LAC and border and accordingly the exchange of maps, and delinking or linking the boundary dispute to other bilateral ties.

Package proposal 
China made the so-called "package" offer in 1960, which again came to the table in 1980–85. As explained by former foreign secretary Shyam Saran, China "would be prepared to accept an alignment in the Eastern Sector, in general conforming to the McMahon Line, but India would have to concede Aksai Chin to China in the Western Sector [...] For the Central Sector, the differences were regarded as relatively minor and manageable." In other words, China "offered to hold 26% of the disputed land".

In 1985 China made modifications to the package— "the Indian side would have to make significant and meaningful concessions in the Eastern Sector... for which China would make corresponding but undefined concessions in the Western Sector". Additionally, Tawang was brought up "as indispensable to any boundary settlement". These changes in the package proposal by China remained till at least 2015.

Linking border and other bilateral relations 
During the first round of renewed talks between China and India in December 1981, China suggested maintaining the status quo on the border question, and in the meantime other relations could be normalized. By the fourth round in October 1983 the Indian negotiators agreed to normalization in other areas. This aspect of linking or de-linking border relations resurfaced in the 2020–2021 China–India skirmishes.

Legal positions 
In the 1980s, during the beginning of talks between the two countries, India made it clear that it would not discuss the legal position of either side as it had already been documented in the 1960 Official's report.

Political initiatives 
During the eighth round of talks in November, 1987, in the background of the Sumdorong Chu standoff, the negotiators on both sides came to a conclusion that apart from these bureaucratic level talks, a political move was needed.

Dispute management and resolution mechanism 
Indian spokesperson for the Ministry of External Affairs stated in May 2020 that there were enough bilateral mechanisms to solve border disputes diplomatically. However, some critics say that these agreements are "deeply flawed".

Bilateral mechanisms 
Bodies/mechanisms have been formed as per bilateral agreements to consult on the boundary question:

Following the 1962 boundary war, official border talks started in December 1981. There were eight rounds of these talks, with the eight round being in 1987. In 1988, through a joint press communique, the border talks were formalized as the 'India-China Joint Working Group on the Boundary Question' (JWG). The JWG met 15 times, the final meeting being in 2005. In 2003 the Special Representatives Mechanism (SRM) was set up as per the 'Declaration on Principles for Relations and Comprehensive Cooperation'.

In April 2005 another agreement mentioned that the JWG, the "India-China Diplomatic and Military Expert Group", and the "Special Representatives on the boundary question" would carry on with their work and consultations. Other than agreements directly related to the border, there have been numerous agreements that worked on other aspects of the bilateral relations such as a memorandum of understanding on military relations that was signed in 2006, that in turn affected the border situation.

Bilateral agreements 

 India China border related agreements
 1988: India-China Joint Working Group on the boundary question
 Trade
 1991: Memorandum on the Resumption of Border Trade
 1992: Protocol on Entry and Exit Procedures for Border Trade
 2003: Memorandum on Expanding Border Trade
 Confidence building measures
 1993: Border Peace and Tranquility Agreement, 1993
 1996: Agreement on Military Confidence Building Measures
 2005: Protocol for the Implementation of Military Confidence Building Measures
 Political measures
 2003: Declaration on Principles for Relations and Comprehensive Cooperation
 2005: Agreement on the Political Parameters and Guiding Principles for the Settlement of the India-China Boundary Question
 2012: Agreement on the Establishment of a Working Mechanism for Consultation and Coordination on India-China Border Affairs
 2013: Border Defence Cooperation Agreement
 2020: 5 point statement

Bilateral military communication channels

Border meeting points

There are five Border Personnel Meeting points (BPM) for holding rounds of dispute resolution talks among the military personnel with a defined escalation path, such as first between colonels, then between brigadiers, and finally between major generals. Of these five BPM, two are in the Indian Union Territory of Ladakh or India's western (northern) sector corresponding to China's Southern Xinxiang Military District, one in Sikkim and two in Arunachal Pradesh in India's central and eastern sectors corresponding to China's Tibet Military District.

Hotlines 
Negotiations for an inter-military hotline started in 2012. It was initially planned for communication between India's Eastern Command and PLA's Chengdu Military Region Command. Negotiations for Director General of Military Operations (DGMOs) level hotline continued in 2013. In 2014 a hotline was set up between the DGMOs of both countries. In 2021 both countries agreed to set up a hotline between their foreign ministers. By 31 July 2021, six hotlines had been set up between commanders; 2 in Ladakh, 2 in Sikkim and 2 in Arunachal Pradesh.

Corps Commander Level Meetings 
'Corps Commander Level Meetings' during the 2020–2021 China–India skirmishes allowed both sides to exchange perspectives and was seen as an important way to keep communication open. The length of these meetings varied from 9 hours to over 12 hours. Apart from the military, the chief of the Indo-Tibetan Border Police and a Ministry of External Affairs representative were also present.

Geostrategic military aspects

Commands and troops deployment 

 

Chinese Military has an integrated Western Theater Command (WTC) across the whole LAC with India. Western Theater Command also covers provinces of Sichuan, Gansu, Ningxia, Qinghai and Chongqing. China has 5 integrated theater commands.

Indian Military has divided the LAC into 3 sectors - the northern sector (some times also called western sector) across Ladakh and the Chinese-held Aksai Chin, the central sector across Himachal Pradesh and Uttrakhand states, and the eastern sector across Sikkim and Arunachal Pradesh states. Similarly, Indian Airforce has Prayagraj-based Western Air Command, Delhi-based Central Air Command, and Shillong-based Eastern Air Command to cover the LAC. India, whose sole integrated command is Andaman and Nicobar Command, is still going through integration of its various geography and services based commands as of 2020.

Belfer Center for Science and International Affairs (BCSIA) carried out an independent analysis of troops deployment in 2020. Indian Army strike forces has 225,000 soldiers near China border all of whom are focused on China, 34,000 in the Northern Command, 15,500 in the Central Command, and 175,500 troops in the Eastern Command, including 3,000 soldiers of T-72 tank brigade in Ladakh and 1,000 soldiers of BrahMos cruise missile regiment in Arunachal Pradesh. Of the 200,000 to 230,000 ground forces under the China's Western Theater Command, only 110,000 are available for focusing on the Indian border, rest are deployed on protecting China's border with Russian in north, and for suppression of internal rebellion in restive Tibet and Xinjinag, or deployed elsewhere deep inside Chinese provinces. Chinese troops aimed at India border, who belong mainly to 76th Group Army and 77th Group Army, 70,000 are deployed in Southern Xinjiang Military District (corresponding to India's northern or western sector in Ladakh) and 40,000 are deployed in Tibet Military District (corresponding to India's central and eastern sector along rest of the LAC from Himachal Pradesh to Arunachal Pradesh), rest will be not be available for deployment on India border in the case of war. This creates a disparity in terms of India's larger number of conventional troops (225,000) focused on China border compared to the smaller number of Chinese troops (90,000-120,000) focused on the Indian border majority of whom are deployed far from the Indian border while Indian troops are deployed with single mission of defence against china. In case of stand offs, while Indian troops are already in position on or near border, China will have to mobilise troops mainly from Xinjiang and secondarily from other troops of Western Theater Command in deep interiors of China.

Command deployment is as follows:

List of disputed areas

List of disputed areas, each with several hundred to several thousand km2 area, is as follows:

Bhutan's Doklam area on Sikkim-China-Bhutan tri-junction, disputed by China in which Bhutan is assisted by India, has been kept out of this list, see also 2017 China–India border standoff at Doklam and Nathu La and Cho La clashes in Sikkim. India and China will hold the 9th round of military commander level talks on 24 January 2021, The talks will be held in Moldo opposite to the Chushul sector in India.

See also

 Annexation of Tibet by the People's Republic of China
 China containment policy
 Chinese salami slicing strategy
 India-China Border Roads
 List of disputed territories of China
 List of disputed territories of India
 List of territorial disputes
 McMahon Line
 Sino-Indian relations
 Sino-Indian War

References 

Bibliography

 

  Also available on scribd.

Further reading

 

 

, provides a detailed description of the border dispute between India and China.

External links 
 Disputed territories of India

Sino-Indian War
Causes of wars
China–India relations
Territorial disputes of China
Territorial disputes of India